The Keraites (also Kerait, Kereit, Khereid;) were one of the five dominant Mongol or Turkic tribal confederations (khanates) in the Altai-Sayan region during the 12th century. They had converted to the Church of the East (Nestorianism) in the early 11th century and are one of the possible sources of the European Prester John legend.

Their original territory was expansive, corresponding to much of what is now Mongolia. Vasily Bartold (1913) located them along the upper Onon and Kherlen rivers and along the Tuul river. They were defeated by Genghis Khan in 1203 and became influential in the rise of the Mongol Empire, and were gradually absorbed into the succeeding Turco-Mongol khanates during the 13th century.

Name 
In modern Mongolian, the confederation is spelled , (Khereid). In English, the name is primarily adopted as Keraites, alternatively Kerait, or Kereyit, in some earlier texts also as Karait or Karaites.

One common theory sees the name as a cognate with the Mongolian  and Turkic qarā for "black, swarthy". There have been various other Mongol and Turkic tribes with names involving the term, which are often conflated.
According to the early 14th-century work Jami' al-tawarikh by Rashid-al-Din Hamadani, Mongol legend traced the clan back to eight brothers with unusually dark faces and the confederation they founded. Kerait was the name of the leading brother's clan, while the clans of his brothers are recorded as Jirkin, Konkant, Sakait, Tumaut, Albat. 
The people was divided into a "central" faction and an "outer" faction. The central faction served as the khan's personal army and was composed of warriors from many different tribes with no loyalties to anyone but the Khan. This made the central faction more of a quasi-feudal state than a genuine tribe. The "outer" faction was composed of tribes that pledged obedience to the khan, but lived on their own tribal pastures and functioned semi-autonomously. The "capital" of the Keraite khanate was a place called Orta Balagasun, which was probably located in an old Uyghur or Khitan fortress.

Markus Buyruk Khan, was a Keraite leader who also led the Zubu confederacy. In 1100, he was killed by the Liao Dynasty. 
Kurchakus Buyruk Khan was a son and successor of Bayruk Markus, among whose wives was Toreqaimish Khatun, daughter of Korchi Buiruk Khan of the Naiman.

Kurchakus's younger brother was Gur Khan. Kurchakus Buyruk Khan had many sons. Notable sons included Toghrul, Yula-Mangus, Tai-Timur, Bukha-Timur.
In union with the Khitan they became vassals in the Kara-Khitai state. 

After Kurchakus Buyruk Khan died, Ilma's Tatar servant Eljidai became the de facto regent. This upset Toghrul who had his younger brothers killed and then claimed the throne as Toghrul khan (Mongolian:Тоорил хан/Tooril khan) who was the son of Kurchakus by Ilma Khatun, reigned from the 1160s to 1203. His palace was located at present-day Ulan Bator and he became blood-brother (anda) to Yesugei. Genghis Khan called him khan etseg ('khan father'). Yesugei, having disposed of all Tughrul's sons, was now the only one in line to inherit the title khan.

The Tatars rebelled against the Jin dynasty in 1195. The Jin commander sent an emissary to Timujin. A fight with the Tatars broke out and the Mongol alliance defeated them. In 1196, the Jin Dynasty awarded Toghrul the title of "Wang" (king). After this, Toghrul was recorded under the title "Wang Khan"  (Ван хан/Van khan; ;  also Ong Khan).
When Timujin attacked Jamukha for the title of Khan, Toghrul, fearing Timujin's growing power, plotted with Jamukha to have Timujin assassinated.

In 1203, Timujin defeated the Keraites, who were distracted by the collapse of their own coalition. 
Toghrul was killed by Naiman soldiers who failed to recognize him as the former was fleeing from a defeat against Genghis Khan.

Mongol Empire and dispersal
Genghis Khan married the oldest niece of Toghrul, Ibaqa, and then two years later divorced her and had her remarried to the general Jürchedei. Genghis Khan' son Tolui married another niece, Sorghaghtani Bekhi, and his son Jochi married a third niece, Begtütmish. Tolui and Sorghaghtani Bekhi became the parents of Möngke Khan and Kublai Khan. The remaining Keraites submitted to Timujin's rule, but out of distrust, Timujin dispersed them among the other Mongol tribes.

Rinchin protected Christians when Ghazan began to persecute them but he was executed by Abu Sa'id Bahadur Khan when fighting against his custodian, Chupan of the Taichiud in 1319.

Keraites arrived in Europe with the Mongol invasion led by Batu Khan and Mongke Khan.  Kaidu's troops in the 1270s were likely mostly composed of Keraites and Naimans.

From the 1380s onward, Nestorian Christianity in Mongolia declined and vanished, on the one hand due to the Islamization under Timur and on the other due to the Ming conquest of Karakorum.
The remnants of the Keraits by late 14th century lived along the Kara Irtysh. These remnants were finally dispersed in the 1420s in the Mongol-Oirat wars fought by Uwais Khan.

Nestorian Christianity 

The Keraites were converted to Nestorianism, a sect of Christianity, early in the 11th century. 
Other tribes evangelized entirely or to a great extent during the 10th and 11th centuries were the Naiman and the Ongud.

Rashid al-Din, the official historian of the Mongol court in Persia, in his  Jami al-Tawarikh states that the Keraites were Christians. William of Rubruck, who encountered many Nestorians during his stay at Mongke Khan's court and at Karakorum in 1254–1255, notes that Nestorianism in Mongolia was tainted by shamanism and Manicheism and very confused in terms of liturgy, not following the usual norms of Christian churches elsewhere in the world. He attributes this to the lack of teachers of the faith, power struggles among the clergy and a willingness to make doctrinal concessions in order to win the favour of the Khans. 
Contact with the Catholics was lost after the Islamization under Timur (reigned 1370–1405), who effectively destroyed the Church of the East. The Nestorian Church in Karakorum was destroyed by the invading Ming dynasty army in 1380.

The legend of Prester John, otherwise set in India or Ethiopia, was also brought in connection with the Nestorian rulers of the Keraites. In some versions of the legend, Prester John was explicitly identified with Toghril, but Mongolian sources say nothing about his religion.

Conversion account
An account of the conversion of this people is given in the 12th-century
Book of the Tower (Kitab al-Majdal) by Mari ibn Suleiman, and also by 13th-century Syriac Orthodox historian Bar Hebraeus where he names them with the Syriac word ܟܹܪܝܼܬ ("Keraith").
 
According to these accounts, shortly before 1007 AD, the Keraite khan lost his way during a snowstorm while hunting in the high mountains of his land. When he had abandoned all hope, a saint, Mar Sergius, appeared in a vision and said, "If you will believe in Christ, I will lead you lest you perish."  The king promised to become Christian, and the saint told him to close his eyes and he found himself back home (Bar Hebraeus' version says the saint led him to the open valley where his home was). When he met Christian merchants, he remembered the vision and asked them about the Christian religion, prayer and the book of canon laws. They taught him "the Lord's Prayer, Lakhu Mara, and Qadisha Alaha." The Lakhu Mara is the Syriac of the hymn Te Deum, and the Qadisha Alaha is the Trisagion. At their suggestion, he sent a message to Abdisho, the Metropolitan of Merv, for priests and deacons to baptize him and his tribe. Abdisho sent a letter to Yohannan V, the Catholicos or Patriarch of the Church of the East in Baghdad (63rd Patriarch after Saint Thomas). Abdisho informed Yohannan V that the Keraite khan asked him about fasting, whether they could be exempted from the usual Christian way of fasting, since their diet was mainly meat and milk.

Abdisho also related that the Keraite khan had already "set up a pavilion to take the place of an altar, in which was a cross and a Gospel, and named it after Mar Sergius, and he tethered a mare there and he takes her milk and lays it on the Gospel and the cross, and recites over it the prayers which he has learned, and makes the sign of the cross over it, and he and his people after him take a draft from it." Yohannan replied to Abdisho telling him one priest and one deacon was to be sent with altar paraments to baptize the king and his people. Yohannan also approved the exemption of the Keraites from strict church law, stating that while they had to abstain from meat during the annual Lenten fast like other Christians, they could still drink milk during that period, although they should switch from "sour milk" (fermented mare's milk) to "sweet milk" (normal milk) to remember the suffering of Christ during the Lenten fast. 
Yohannan also told Abdisho to endeavor to find wheat and wine for them, so they can celebrate the Paschal Eucharist. As a result of the mission that followed, the king and 200,000 of his people were baptized (both Bar Hebraeus and Mari ibn Suleiman give the same number).

Legacy 
After the final dispersal of the remaining Keraites settling along the Irtysh River by the Oirats in the early 15th century, they disappear as an identifiable group. There are various hypotheses as to which groups may partially have been derived from them during the 16th or 17th century. 
According to Tynyshbaev (1925), their further fate was closely linked to that of the 
Argyn.

The name of the Qarai Turks may be derived from the Keraites, but it may also be connected to the names of various other Central Asian groups involving qara "black". Kipchak groups such as the Argyn Kazakhs and the Kyrgyz Kireis have been proposed as possibly in part derived from the remnants of the Keraites who sought refuge in Eastern Europe in the early 15th century.

See also 
 List of medieval Mongol tribes and clans
 List of Mongol states

References

Citations

Sources
 Boyle, John Andrew, "The Summer and Winter Camping Grounds of the Kereit,"  Central Asiatic Journal 17  (1973), 108–110.
 Douglas Morton Dunlop, The Karaits of East Asia",  Bulletin of the School of Oriental and African Studies, University of London, 1944, 276–289.
 
 Khoyt, S.K., Кереиты в этногенезе народов Евразии: историография проблемы ("Keraites in the ethnogenesis of the peoples of Eurasia: historiography of the problem"), Elista: Kalmyk State University Press (2008). 
 Kudaiberdy-Uly, Sh. (Кудайберды-Улы, Шакарим),  КЕРЕИ  "Родословная тюрков, киргизов, казахов и ханских династий" (trans. Бахыт Каирбеков), Alma-Ata, 1990.
Németh, Julius, "Kereit, Kérey, Giray" Ural-Altaische Jahrbücher  36 (1965), 360–365. 
Togan, İsenbike, "Flexibility and Limitation in Steppe Formations: the Kerait Khanate and Chinggis Khan" in: The Ottoman Empire and its Heritage, Vol. 15, Leiden: Brill (1998).
 Tynyshbaev, M. (Тынышбаев, Мухамеджан), КЕРЕИ   "Материалы по истории казахского народа", Tashkent, 1925.

Nestorianism
History of Mongolia
Kerait people